Adolf Möller (25 October 1877 in Hamburg – 10 November 1968 in Hamburg) was a German rower who competed in the 1900 Summer Olympics. He was part of the German crew who won the bronze medal in the coxed fours final A.

References

External links

 

1877 births
1968 deaths
Olympic rowers of Germany
Rowers at the 1900 Summer Olympics
Olympic bronze medalists for Germany
Olympic medalists in rowing
German male rowers
Medalists at the 1900 Summer Olympics
Rowers from Hamburg